Capela do Alto is a municipality in the state of São Paulo in Brazil. It is part of the Metropolitan Region of Sorocaba. The population is 20,985 (2020 est.) in an area of 169.89 km². The elevation is 625 m.

Population history

Demographics

According to the 2000 IBGE Census, the population was 14,247, of which 11,111 are urban and 3,136 are rural. The average life expectancy was 69.31 years. The literacy rate was 89.43%.

References

External links
  http://www.capeladoalto.sp.gov.br
  Capela do Alto on citybrazil.com.br

Municipalities in São Paulo (state)